Rakesh Rathore is an Indian politician representing Sitapur, Uttar Pradesh Assembly constituency for last two terms. He is a member of Bharatiya Janata Party. Rathore won 2022 Uttar Pradesh Legislative Assembly election and 2017 Uttar Pradesh Legislative Assembly election.

References 

Living people
People from Sitapur district
Year of birth missing (living people)
Bharatiya Janata Party politicians from Uttar Pradesh
Samajwadi Party politicians from Uttar Pradesh